If Only You Were Lonely is the second studio album by American rock band Hawthorne Heights and the final album to feature rhythm guitarist and unclean backing vocalist Casey Calvert before his death on November 24, 2007. It was produced by David Bendeth. The title of the album is in reference to a B-side by The Replacements of the same name.

Production
If Only You Were Lonely was recorded in September and October 2005 at Water Music in Hoboken, New Jersey, with producer David Bendeth. Dan Korneff and John Bender served as engineers, and both did digital editing, alongside Kato Khandwala. Ted Young aided them as assistant engineer. Korneff provided additional guitar production, and set up mixing, which was done by Bendeth and assistant Isaiah Abolin at Sound on Sound Studios and Right Track Studios, both in New York City in October 2005. Ted Jensen mastered the recordings at Sterling Sound.

Story
If Only You Were Lonely is a concept album following the long-distance relationship between a young couple who were unwillingly torn apart because of the boy's family moving (hence the line in the opening track, "I know it seems like we're never coming back"). Throughout the album, the couple keep their relationship going while talking on the phone and look back on the pain they went through due to their separation. This is especially evident in "Pens and Needles" and "Saying Sorry". In the album's final track, "Decembers", the boy remembers all the times he had with his girlfriend and wishes he could have her back. Their relationship is also shown in the cover for both the original and alternate version of the album, as you can see a man sleeping by himself in the original and a woman sleeping by herself in the alternate version.

The name for the track, "Where Can I Stab Myself in the Ears?", is derived from a post on a forum that was an announcement for Hawthorne Heights' release on the popular music news website, AbsolutePunk.

Release
In October 2005, Hawthorne Heights toured the UK with labelmates Bayside, Silverstein and Spitalfield; it lead into a two-month tour of the US with those same acts, plus Aiden, dubbed the Never Sleep Again Tour. On November 23, 2005, If Only You Were Lonely was announced for release in three months' time; the album's track listing was posted online ten days later. "Saying Sorry" was made available for streaming solely on Christmas Day and Christmas Eve 2005 through their Myspace profile. This Is Who We Are, the band's first video album, was released on January 10, 2006; it included footage from the Never Sleep Again Tour, which saw the debut of three new songs, namely "Light Sleeper", "Where Can I Stab Myself in the Ears", and "This Is Who We Are".

In January 2006, Hawthorne Heights embarked on a UK tour with Still Remains, Aiden, and Bullet for My Valentine. A music video was released for "Saying Sorry" via AOL Music on January 16, 2005; it was released to radio on January 31, 2006. In February and March 2006, the group went on a tour of the US alongside Emery, Anberlin, June and Bleed the Dream. During this stint, If Only You Were Lonely was made available for streaming through AOL on February 6, 2006, before being released on February 28, 2006. From March to May 2006, the group toured with Fall Out Boy on their North American arena tour, titled the Black Clouds and Underdogs Tour. On May 25, 2006, the music video for "This Is Who We Are" was posted online. They appeared at The Bamboozle festival; following this, "Pens and Needles" was released to radio on June 13, 2006. In July, the band went on a tour of Canada alongside Story of the Year and Anberlin.

Throughout July and August 2006, the band performed a number of free intimate shows; fans could gain entry by signing up with Rockcorps. On August 7, it was announced that the band had left Victory Records, citing a lack of royalty payment. The following month, they appeared at the Bumbershoot festival. From September to November, the band headlined the 2006 edition of the Nintendo Fusion Tour. "I Am on Your Side" impacted radio on October 10. In June and July 2007, the bands went on a U.S. tour with support from From First to Last, Secondhand Serenade, Brighten and Powerspace. Following this, the group appeared on the 2007 edition of Warped Tour. In November and December, the band went on a headlining US tour dubbed Wintour. They were supported by Escape the Fate, Amber Pacific, the A.K.A.s and the Secret Handshake.

Music videos were made for three tracks from the album. The video for "This Is Who We Are" was filmed at the Minneapolis stop of the Black Clouds Tour on April 14, 2006. The band later filmed a music video for "Pens and Needles" in Miami. The video was directed by Dale "Rage" Resteghini. Yet another Music Video was filmed for "Saying Sorry".

Reception

If Only You Were Lonely debuted at #3 on the Billboard 200 and #1 on the Top Independent Albums chart, spending a total of 17 weeks on the former. It is the band's highest charting album to date. The album was certified Gold by the RIAA on March 24, 2016.

Track listing
All arrangements by Hawthorne Heights and David Bendeth.

Personnel
Personnel per booklet.

Hawthorne Heights
 Micah Carli – lead guitar
 Casey Calvert – rhythm guitar, unclean vocals
 JT Woodruff – lead vocals, guitar
 Eron Bucciarelli – drums
 Matt Ridenour – bass, backing vocals

Additional musicians
 John Bender – additional backing vocals
 The Hawthorne Gang – additional vocals (tracks 8 and 11)
 Sebastian Davin – piano (track 12)

Design
 Paul Friemel – art direction, layout, original layout concept
 Dave Hill – photos
 Neil Visel – photo assistant
 Selena Salfen – band photography
 DoubleJ – original layout concept

Production
 David Bendeth – producer, mixing
 Dan Korneff – engineer, digital editing, additional guitar production, mix setup
 John Bender – digital editing, engineer
 Ted Young – assistant engineer
 Isaiah Abolin – mixing assistant
 Kato Khandwala - digital editing
 Ted Jensen – mastering

Charts

Weekly charts

Singles

Year-end charts

Certifications

References

2006 albums
Hawthorne Heights albums
Victory Records albums
Albums produced by David Bendeth